Lars-Emil Johansen (born 24 September 1946) is a Greenlandic politician who served as the second prime minister of Greenland from 1991 to 1997, and Speaker of the Inatsisartut from 2013 to 2018.

Johansen was chairman of the political party Siumut (Forward) between 1987 and 1997, seated in the Landsting from its creation in 1979. Prior to the creation of the Landsting, he represented Greenland in the Parliament of Denmark from 1973, a position he regained in 2001 and held until 2011. He was also President of the West Nordic Council from 2015 to 2016.

Early life 
He was born in Illorsuit, a small settlement near Uummannaq in the Qaasuitsup municipality, as son of commercial agent Kristian Johansen and district midwife Elisabeth Johansen; his mother had been the first female country council member from 1959 to 1975.

In 1970, Johansen finished his education as a teacher, and the following year he was elected for the Greenland country council, the most powerful local authority in Greenland prior to the creation of the Landsting.

He has been appointed a Commander of the Danish Order of the Dannebrog and the Royal Norwegian Order of Merit, as well as two types of the Nersornaat, the silver Nersornaat and the golden Nersornaat (the Greenland Medal for Meritorious Service).

Order of Dannebrog, Knight Commander of the Norwegian Star.

References

External links
 

1946 births
Living people
People from Qaasuitsup
Siumut politicians
Chairmen of the Parliament of Greenland
Prime Ministers of Greenland
Finance ministers of Greenland
Fisheries ministers of Greenland
Foreign ministers of Greenland
Members of the Folketing 1973–1975
Members of the Folketing 1975–1977
Members of the Folketing 1977–1979
Members of the Folketing 2001–2005
Members of the Folketing 2005–2007
Members of the Folketing 2007–2011
Commanders of the Order of the Dannebrog
Recipients of Nersornaat
Greenlandic members of the Folketing